Lyophyllum littoralis, is a grey edible mushroom of the genus Lyophyllum. It is closely related to Lyophyllum decastes. It is hot climate fungus species common in Mediterranean coniferous woodlands. Often growing in clusters.

Taxonomy 
Lyophyllum littoralis was first described as a separate species in 1998 by Italian mycologist Marco Contu.

Description 
The smooth cap is 5–15 cm (2–6 in) wide mottled grey to brownish grey colour, with darker splotches tending to be around the edge. Often covered in a whitish powder. Cap shape in younger specimen tends to be round and becomes convoluted with age, with the cap edge pointing downwards.

The stipe is 1.5–4 cm (0.6–1.6 in) high and up to 0.4-1.5 cm wide and has no ring nor volva. Often hollow the stipe ranges from white at the top to grey at the bottom with older specimen being grey

The gills are white tending to pale yellow-grey in older specimen. the gills densely packed, can be free (unattached to the stipe) or slightly sliding to the stipe.  

The flesh is thin and rubbery, and does not break easily, especially the stipe. Older specimen (especially after sporulation) exude a distinct coconut scent. Younger specimen have no discernible scent or taste prior to cooking.

White spore in bulk. Spores 4.5-5.5 (6) × 4.5-5.5 μm, globular, smooth, cyanophile, often with central guttula. Tetrasporic, trivial basidia. GAF present in all tissues.

Distribution and habitat 
Lyophyllum littoralis is found in Mediterranean woodlands, where fruiting bodies appear under conifers, particularly pine, from November to January. They generally appear in clumps connected to the same base, but can also appear individually.

Edibility 

With a taste reminiscent of fried chicken and texture that retains its firmness after frying, the species is a good edible.

References

External links
 Lyophyllum littoralis - Gruppo Micologico «G. Bresadola»

Lyophyllaceae
Fungi of Europe
Fungi described in 1998
Edible fungi